Richard Francis Charles Yorke (28 July 1885 – 22 December 1914) was a British track and field athlete who competed in the 1908 Summer Olympics and in the 1912 Summer Olympics.

In 1908 he was eliminated in the first round of the 3200 metre steeplechase event. Four years later he was eliminated in the first round of the 800 metres event as well as of the 1500 metres competition.

Yorke was killed in action aged 29 during the First World War, serving as a sergeant with the London Scottish Regiment near Arras. He is buried in the Arras Road Cemetery in Roclincourt.

See also
 List of Olympians killed in World War I

References

External links
Olympic athlete profile

1885 births
1914 deaths
British male middle-distance runners
Olympic athletes of Great Britain
Athletes (track and field) at the 1908 Summer Olympics
Athletes (track and field) at the 1912 Summer Olympics
British military personnel killed in World War I
London Scottish soldiers
British Army personnel of World War I
British male steeplechase runners